Boris Adrián Céspedes (born 19 June 1995) is a Bolivian professional footballer who plays as a midfielder for Swiss Super League club Servette FC and the Bolivia national team.

Professional career
A youth product of Servette FC, Céspedes debuted with the first team in 2013. He made his professional debut with Servette in a 1–1 draw with BSC Young Boys in the Swiss Super League on 21 July 2019.

International career
Céspedes was born in Bolivia and raised in Switzerland. He was a youth international for Switzerland. On 9 October 2020, he debuted for the Bolivia national team in a 5–0 loss to Brazil in a 2022 World Cup qualifying match.

International goals
Scores and results list Bolivia's goal tally first.

References

External links
 
 Soccerway Profile
 SFL Profile

1995 births
Living people
Sportspeople from Santa Cruz de la Sierra
Bolivian footballers
Bolivia international footballers
Swiss men's footballers
Swiss people of Bolivian descent
Bolivian emigrants to Switzerland
Naturalised citizens of Switzerland
Association football midfielders
Servette FC players
Étoile Carouge FC players
Swiss Super League players
Swiss Challenge League players
2021 Copa América players